Ridgefield is a borough in Bergen County, in the U.S. state of New Jersey. As of the 2020 United States census, the borough's population was 11,501, an increase of 469 (+4.3%) from the 2010 census count of 11,032, which in turn reflected an increase of 202 (+1.9%) from the 10,830 counted in the 2000 census.

Ridgefield was incorporated as a borough by an act of the New Jersey Legislature on May 26, 1892, from portions of Ridgefield Township. The borough was named for the area's terrain.

History
At the time of European colonization, the area was home to the Hackensack tribe of the Lenape Native Americans, who maintained a large settlement to the north on Overpeck Creek. Their name is an exonym taken from the territory and is translated as place of stony ground  which describes the diminishing Hudson Palisades as they descend into the Meadowlands becoming the ridgefield that is part of Hackensack River flood plain.

In 1642, Myndert Myndertsen received a patroonship as part of the New Netherland colony for much the land in the Hackensack and Passaic valleys. He called his settlement Achter Kol, or rear mountain pass, which refers to its accessibility to the interior behind the Palisades. Originally spared in the conflicts that begin with the Pavonia Massacre, the nascent colony was later abandoned. In 1655, Oratam, sachem of the Hackensack, deeded a large tract nearby to Sara Kiersted, who had learned the native language and was instrumental in negotiations between Native Americans and the settlers. In 1668, much of the land between Overpeck Creek and the Hudson River was purchased by Samuel Edsall, and soon became known as the English Neighborhood, despite the fact most of the settlers were of Dutch and Huguenot origin.

The opening of the West Shore Railroad and Erie Railroad's Northern Branch in the mid 19th century brought suburbanization to the region, and in Ridgefield, significant industry and manufacturing. Grantwood was an artist's colony established in 1913 by Man Ray, Alfred Kreymborg and Samuel Halpert and became known as the "Others" group of artists. The colony consisted of a number of clapboard shacks on a bluff. To this day the names of the streets in this part of the town—Sketch Place, Studio Road and Art Lane—pay homage to Grantwood's history. Kreymborg moved to Ridgefield and launched Others: A Magazine of the New Verse with Skipwith Cannell, Wallace Stevens, and William Carlos Williams in 1915.

The initial  of the New Jersey Turnpike were completed in 1952, with the original northern terminus at an interchange connecting to Route 46 in Ridgefield. An additional four-mile stretch of road connecting the Turnpike from Ridgefield to Interstate 80 in Teaneck and from there to the George Washington Bridge was completed in 1964. The western spur was added in the 1970s, with its two spurs re-connecting in the western side of the borough.

In the 1970s, the area came under the auspices of the Hackensack Meadowlands Development Commission, meant to set parameters and balance development in the ecologically sensitive region. Some parts of the low-lying areas, including Skeetkill Creek Marsh, have been set apart as nature reserves and extension of system that connects to the Overpeck Reserve and Overpeck County Park.

Geography

According to the United States Census Bureau, the borough had a total area of 2.87 square miles (7.43 km2), including 2.54 square miles (6.59 km2) of land and 0.33 square miles (0.85 km2) of water (11.39%).

The borough shares borders with Carlstadt, Cliffside Park, Fairview, Fort Lee, Little Ferry, Palisades Park, Ridgefield Park and South Hackensack in Bergen County; and North Bergen in Hudson County.

The borough is informally divided into three sections based on the geographical contour of the land. The first section is known as Ridgefield, and lies partly in the valley on both the east and west sides and partly on the first hill. The second section is known as Morsemere, and is located in the northern part of the borough. The third section is Ridgefield Heights, on the second hill at the extreme eastern part of the borough, running north and south.

Undercliff Junction is an unincorporated community located within Ridgefield.. Morsemere, which includes the southernmost part of Palisade Park, was named by a real estate development company in honor of Samuel F. B. Morse, inventor of the telegraph and Morse code. During the middle of the 19th century, Morse owned vast tracts of land in the borough. Ridgefield's telephone exchange was Morsemere 6 until dial service arrived in the mid-1950s. Grantwood straddles Cliffside Park.

Demographics

2010 census

The Census Bureau's 2006–2010 American Community Survey showed that (in 2010 inflation-adjusted dollars) median household income was $59,784 (with a margin of error of +/− $12,149) and the median family income was $76,618 (+/− $5,428). Males had a median income of $51,682 (+/− $4,297) versus $39,178 (+/− $5,838) for females. The per capita income for the borough was $28,107 (+/− $2,625). About 3.7% of families and 5.5% of the population were below the poverty line, including 4.2% of those under age 18 and 7.5% of those age 65 or over.

2000 census
As of the 2000 United States census there were 10,830 people, 4,020 households, and 2,966 families residing in the borough. The population density was 4,149.8 people per square mile (1,602.1/km2). There were 4,120 housing units at an average density of 1,578.7 per square mile (609.5/km2). The racial makeup of the borough was 75.87% White, 0.77% African American, 0.08% Native American, 17.42% Asian, 0.04% Pacific Islander, 3.50% from other races, and 2.32% from two or more races. Hispanic or Latino of any race were 13.80% of the population.

As of the 2000 Census, 16.31% of Ridgefield's residents identified themselves as being of Korean ancestry, which was the sixth highest in the United States and fourth highest of any municipality in New Jersey—behind Palisades Park (36.38%), Leonia (17.24%) and Fort Lee (17.18%)—for all places with 1,000 or more residents identifying their ancestry. In the same census, 3.0% of Ridgefield's residents identified themselves as being of Croatian ancestry. This was the third highest percentage of people with Croatian ancestry in any place in New Jersey with 1,000 or more residents identifying their ancestry. 2.4% of Ridgefield's residents identified themselves as being of Armenian ancestry, the 16th highest percentage of Armenian people in any place in the United States with 1,000 or more residents identifying their ancestry. As of the 2000 Census, 1.3% of residents identified themselves as being of Turkish American ancestry, the seventh-highest of any municipality in the United States and fifth-highest in the state.

There were 4,020 households, out of which 32.1% had children under the age of 18 living with them, 59.7% were married couples living together, 9.9% had a female householder with no husband present, and 26.2% were non-families. 23.0% of all households were made up of individuals, and 11.8% had someone living alone who was 65 years of age or older. The average household size was 2.69 and the average family size was 3.19.

In the borough, the population was spread out, with 21.8% under the age of 18, 6.3% from 18 to 24, 31.5% from 25 to 44, 23.3% from 45 to 64, and 17.1% who were 65 years of age or older. The median age was 40 years. For every 100 females, there were 93.7 males. For every 100 females age 18 and over, there were 88.8 males.

The median income for a household in the borough was $54,081, and the median income for a family was $66,330. Males had a median income of $47,975 versus $36,676 for females. The per capita income for the borough was $25,558. About 4.7% of families and 6.6% of the population were below the poverty line, including 6.4% of those under age 18 and 6.7% of those age 65 or over.

Government

Local government

Ridgefield is governed under the Borough form of New Jersey municipal government, which is used in 218 municipalities (of the 564) statewide, making it the most common form of government in New Jersey. The governing body is comprised of a Mayor and a Borough Council, with all positions elected at-large on a partisan basis as part of the November general election. A Mayor is elected directly by the voters to a four-year term of office. The Borough Council is comprised of six members elected to serve three-year terms on a staggered basis, with two seats coming up for election each year in a three-year cycle. The Borough form of government used by Ridgefield is a "weak mayor / strong council" government in which council members act as the legislative body with the mayor presiding at meetings and voting only in the event of a tie. The mayor can veto ordinances subject to an override by a two-thirds majority vote of the council. The mayor makes committee and liaison assignments for council members, and most appointments are made by the mayor with the advice and consent of the council.

, the Mayor of Ridgefield Borough is Democrat Anthony R. Suarez, whose term of office ends on December 31, 2023. Members of the Ridgefield Borough Council are Council President Russell A. Castelli (D, 2023), Craig Dorsett (D, 2024), Hugo Jimenez (D, 2025), James V. Kontolios (D, 2025), Lauren Larkin (D, 2023) and Yongki Colin Ryu (D, 2024; appointed to serve an unexpired term).

In January 2023, the borough council selected Yongki Colin Ryu to fill the seat expiring in December 2024 that had been held by Ray Penabad until he resigned from office; Ryu will serve on an interim basis until the November 2023 general election, when voters will select a candidate to serve the balance of the term of office.

In June 2018, the Borough Council selected Lauren Larkin from a list of three candidates to fill the seat expiring in December 2020 that became vacant following the resignation of Javier Acosta. Larkin served on an interim basis until the November 2018 general election, when she was elected to serve the balance of the term of office.

In July 2009, Mayor Suarez was one of 44 people arrested across the state as part of Operation Bid Rig, a joint investigation into political corruption and money laundering. Suarez was charged with accepting a $10,000 cash bribe for assistance in arranging approvals to develop properties in Ridgefield. In a special election in August 2010, an effort to recall Suarez failed by a 38-vote margin. He was acquitted on all charges in October 2010.

Federal, state and county representation
Ridgefield is located in the 9th Congressional District and is part of New Jersey's 36th state legislative district. Prior to the 2011 reapportionment following the 2010 Census, Ridgefield had been in the 38th state legislative district.

Politics
As of March 2011, there were a total of 5,467 registered voters in Ridgefield, of which 1,810 (33.1% vs. 31.7% countywide) were registered as Democrats, 1,098 (20.1% vs. 21.1%) were registered as Republicans and 2,558 (46.8% vs. 47.1%) were registered as Unaffiliated. There was one voter registered to another party. Among the borough's 2010 Census population, 49.6% (vs. 57.1% in Bergen County) were registered to vote, including 63.2% of those ages 18 and over (vs. 73.7% countywide).

In the 2012 presidential election, Democrat Barack Obama received 2,320 votes here (58.3% vs. 54.8% countywide), ahead of Republican Mitt Romney with 1,570 votes (39.4% vs. 43.5%) and other candidates with 42 votes (1.1% vs. 0.9%), among the 3,980 ballots cast by the borough's 5,848 registered voters, for a turnout of 68.1% (vs. 70.4% in Bergen County). In the 2008 presidential election, Democrat Barack Obama received 2,319 votes here (53.0% vs. 53.9% countywide), ahead of Republican John McCain with 1,960 votes (44.8% vs. 44.5%) and other candidates with 40 votes (0.9% vs. 0.8%), among the 4,372 ballots cast by the borough's 5,853 registered voters, for a turnout of 74.7% (vs. 76.8% in Bergen County). In the 2004 presidential election, Democrat John Kerry received 2,172 votes here (51.0% vs. 51.7% countywide), ahead of Republican George W. Bush with 2,038 votes (47.8% vs. 47.2%) and other candidates with 23 votes (0.5% vs. 0.7%), among the 4,262 ballots cast by the borough's 5,845 registered voters, for a turnout of 72.9% (vs. 76.9% in the whole county).

In the 2013 gubernatorial election, Republican Chris Christie received 56.8% of the vote (1,410 cast), ahead of Democrat Barbara Buono with 41.9% (1,040 votes), and other candidates with 1.3% (33 votes), among the 2,625 ballots cast by the borough's 5,586 registered voters (142 ballots were spoiled), for a turnout of 47.0%. In the 2009 gubernatorial election, Democrat Jon Corzine received 1,390 ballots cast (48.0% vs. 48.0% countywide), ahead of Republican Chris Christie with 1,281 votes (44.2% vs. 45.8%), Independent Chris Daggett with 135 votes (4.7% vs. 4.7%) and other candidates with 18 votes (0.6% vs. 0.5%), among the 2,898 ballots cast by the borough's 5,658 registered voters, yielding a 51.2% turnout (vs. 50.0% in the county).

Education

The Ridgefield School District serves public school students in pre-kindergarten through twelfth grade. As of the 2018–19 school year, the district, comprised of four schools, had an enrollment of 1,480 students and 158.7 classroom teachers (on an FTE basis), for a student–teacher ratio of 9.3:1. Schools in the district (with 2018–19 enrollment from the National Center for Education Statistics) are 
Shaler Academy and Bergen Boulevard School with 191 students in grades Pre-K/K and 196 students in grades 1–2, 
Slocum-Skewes School with 771 students in grades 3–8 and 
Ridgefield Memorial High School with 514 students in grades 9–12.

Public school students from the borough, and all of Bergen County, are eligible to attend the secondary education programs offered by the Bergen County Technical Schools, which include the Bergen County Academies in Hackensack, and the Bergen Tech campus in Teterboro or Paramus. The district offers programs on a shared-time or full-time basis, with admission based on a selective application process and tuition covered by the student's home school district.

Transportation

Roads and highways

The New Jersey Turnpike (Interstate 95) passes through Ridgefield. The Turnpike's Vince Lombardi service area is located between Interchanges 18E/18W and the George Washington Bridge at mileposts 116E on the Eastern Spur and 115.5W on the Western Spur.

U.S. Route 1/9, U.S. Route 46, Route 63, Route 93 and Route 5 also pass through Ridgefield.

Public transportation
NJ Transit provides bus service to and from the Port Authority Bus Terminal in Midtown Manhattan on the 127, 154, 165, 166, 168 and the 321 (an 18-minute ride from the Vince Lombardi Park & Ride) routes and to Jersey City on the 83 route.

Original plans for the Hudson–Bergen Light Rail included a northern terminus at Vince Lombardi Park & Ride. Plans for an extension through the town called the Northern Branch Corridor Project call for a station in the borough along the Northern Branch right-of-way at Hendricks Parkway. The station at the park and ride is being studied as part of the Passaic–Bergen–Hudson Transit Project.

Notable people

People who were born in, residents of, or otherwise closely associated with Ridgefield include:

 Tim Bogert (born 1944), bass guitarist and vocalist
 Marlene Caride (born 1963), politician who served in the New Jersey General Assembly from 2012 to 2018, where she represented the 36th Legislative District
 Marcel Duchamp (1887–1968), French artist
 Ronald Enroth (born 1938), Professor of Sociology at Westmont College
 Gilbert Gaul (1855–1919), painter and illustrator of military subjects ranging from the American Civil War to World War I, as well as American Western vistas and scenes
 Samuel Halpert (1884–1930), painter
 Thomas H. Herring (1812–1874), President of the New Jersey Senate in 1859 as well as the President of the Northern Railroad starting in 1859
 David Schenk Jacobus (1862–1955), mechanical engineer who served as president of the American Society of Mechanical Engineers in the year 1916–1917
 Frederick Krafft (1860–1933), socialist political activist and politician, who was convicted in 1918 for a violation of the Espionage Act and was the only person convicted under this law to receive a full executive pardon from President Woodrow Wilson
 Alfred Kreymborg (1883–1966), poet and novelist
 Joseph Lagana (born 1978), politician who has represented the 38th Legislative District in the New Jersey General Assembly since January 2014
 Chris Lema (born 1995), footballer who plays as a midfielder for New York Red Bulls II in the United Soccer League
 Man Ray (1890–1976), one of the most important painters and photographers of the Surrealist and Dada movements, had a house in an artists' colony that once existed in Ridgefield
 Judd Sergeant, contestant on the eleventh season of Survivor
 Bob Schroder (born 1944), MLB infielder who played for the San Francisco Giants
 Alexander Shaler (1827–1911), Union Army general in the American Civil War who later served as Mayor of Ridgefield, New Jersey
 Gregor Weiss (born 1941), artistic gymnast who represented the United States at the 1964 Summer Olympics, placing 7th in the team event
 Henry Wessel Jr. (1942–2018), photographer and educator
 William Carlos Williams (1883–1963), poet

In popular culture
 Ridgefield is the setting for the 1998 Adam Sandler film (and subsequent 2006 musical) The Wedding Singer.

See also
 List of U.S. cities with significant Korean-American populations

References

Sources 

 Municipal Incorporations of the State of New Jersey (according to Counties) prepared by the Division of Local Government, Department of the Treasury (New Jersey); December 1, 1958.
 Clayton, W. Woodford; and Nelson, William. History of Bergen and Passaic Counties, New Jersey, with Biographical Sketches of Many of its Pioneers and Prominent Men., Philadelphia: Everts and Peck, 1882.
 Harvey, Cornelius Burnham (ed.), Genealogical History of Hudson and Bergen Counties, New Jersey. New York: New Jersey Genealogical Publishing Co., 1900.
 Van Valen, James M. History of Bergen County, New Jersey. New York: New Jersey Publishing and Engraving Co., 1900.
 Westervelt, Frances A. (Frances Augusta), 1858–1942, History of Bergen County, New Jersey, 1630–1923, Lewis Historical Publishing Company, 1923.

External links

 Ridgefield Borough official website
 Ridgefield School District
 
 School Data for the Ridgefield School District, National Center for Education Statistics

 
1892 establishments in New Jersey
Borough form of New Jersey government
Boroughs in Bergen County, New Jersey
New Jersey Meadowlands District
Populated places established in 1892